Galactic Warrior Rats is a platform game developed by Mikev Design and published by Summit Software in 1992 for the Amiga. A port to MS-DOS was released the following year. The game was included in the 1994 Famous Collection compilation.

Plot
Three laboratory rats named Einstein, Newton, and Darwin are on board a spaceship, when unexpectedly the spaceship crashes into a mysterious planet called Smeaton Five. The explosion of the spaceship kills all on board, but mutates the rats into humanoid-like creatures, they self-christen Galactic Warrior Rats. Smeaton Five is highly polluted and is rigged for destruction. The three rats venture through the planet's dangerous complex to destroy any defense robot that gets in their way and ultimately shut down the core computer to save Smeaton Five and themselves.

Gameplay
The player chooses of one of the three Galactic Warrior Rats who pilot a biosphere vehicle. The biosphere can have its speed, weapons, ammunition and handling upgraded. Upgrades require credits. During the gameplay, the player will maneuver the rat in his biosphere. The object is to guide the biosphere through maze-like levels to the exit. The biosphere can fire in one of eight directions. Destroying enemies earns credits. Touching enemies drains the biosphere's vitality. If one rat dies in the biosphere explosion, the player must choose a different rat to play. If all three rats are destroyed, then the game is over.

Reception

References

External links
Galactic Warrior Rats at Lemon Amiga

1992 video games
Amiga games
Amiga 1200 games
DOS games
Puzzle video games
Science fiction video games
Single-player video games
Video games about mice and rats
Video games developed in the United Kingdom
Video games set on fictional planets